Association Sportive Tempête Mocaf (first part French for storm) is a Central African Republic football club located in Bangui, Central African Republic. It currently plays in the Central African Republic League.

Current and Former Players
 Armel Oroko
 Boris Sandjo

Titles
Central African Republic League: 12

1976, 1984, 1990, 1993, 1994, 1996, 1997, 1999, 2003, 2009, 2013/14, 2018/19
Central African Republic Coupe Nationale: 6
1974, 1982, 1985, 1992, 2003, 2011

Positions
1999: 1st
2003: 1st
2009: 1st
2011: 2nd
2012: 3rd
2013–14: 1st
2015–16: 2nd
2018–19: 1st

Performance in CAF competitions

1 Gagnoa withdrew
2 The club was disqualified for not paying a fee
3 Tempête Mocaf withdrew

Statistics
Best position: Second Round (continental)

References

External links
 AS Tempête Mocaf soccerway.com
 Continental Tournaments
AS Tempête Mocaf facebook.com

 
Bangui
Football clubs in the Central African Republic

pt:AS Tempête Mocaf